Xylotrupes taprobanes, is a species of rhinoceros beetle found in India and Sri Lanka.

Description
The subspecies X. t. ganesha is described as follows:

This glabrous and less shiny beetle is typically dark brown in color. Male is about 58 mm in length. Clypus broad and weakly emarginated. Pronotum large and more or less trapezoidal. A thoracic horn found on the disc. Scutellum matte, and punctuated. Elytra weakly shiny, broad convex and finely and irregularly punctuated. Pygidium densely punctuated except apex.

Subspecies
Two subspecies are recognized.

 Xylotrupes taprobanus ganesha Silvestre, 2003
 Xylotrupes taprobanus taprobanus Prell, 1914

References 

Scarabaeinae
Insects of Sri Lanka
Insects of India
Insects described in 1914